3/3 is an infantry battalion in the United States Marine Corps.

3/3 may also refer to:

 3/3 Lahore Attacks, a 2009 attack on the Sri Lanka national cricket team
 March 3, the 62nd day of most years in the Gregorian calendar
 3/3, an early band by Japanese musicians Reck and Chiko Hige of the Contortions and Friction fame.

See also

 3 + 3
 3 in Three
 3.3 (disambiguation)
 3@Three